Il corpo della ragassa is a 1979 commedia sexy all'italiana film directed by Pasquale Festa Campanile. It is based on the 1969 novel with the same name by Gianni Brera.

Plot    
Teresa Aguzzi, called Tirisìn, is the beautiful daughter of Pasquale, a sand digger on the banks of the Po, in the lower province of Pavia in the thirties. During a trip to the city, the girl is noticed by the wealthy professor Ulderico Quario and immediately hired as a waitress in his palace. Assisted by the faithful housekeeper Caterina, the doctor improvises a pigmalione in the training of the rough Tirisìn in the arts of refined femininity, in order to be able to exhibit her as a sexual toy to her friends.

At the beginning Tirisìn shows some perplexities in being involved in this libertine game, but the happiness of the father, who with the new salary has finally managed to build a latrine inside their poor home, and the good advice of an expert maîtresse, they convince her to participate and, on the contrary, to take on a leading role and try to make the most of the situation.

Cast 
 Lilli Carati as Teresa Aguzzi, aka "Tirisìn"
 Enrico Maria Salerno as Professor Ulderico Quario
 Marisa Belli as  Cecchina
 Elsa Vazzoler as  Caterina
 Nino Bignamini as  Erminio Alvarini
 Clara Colosimo as  Procurer
 Giuliana Calandra as Laura Marengo
 Gino Pernice as  Giovanni
 Renzo Montagnani as  Pasquale Aguzzi

See also      
 List of Italian films of 1979

References

External links

1979 films
Commedia sexy all'italiana
1970s sex comedy films
Films directed by Pasquale Festa Campanile
Films scored by Riz Ortolani
1979 comedy films
1970s Italian-language films
1970s Italian films